Count Semyon Zorich (1743–1799) was an Imperial Russian lieutenant-general and count of the Holy Roman Empire, born in Serbia, who served Imperial Russia against the Prussians and Turks. A member of the Russian court, he was presented to Empress Catherine the Great by Grigory Potemkin and, after having been tested by Praskovja Bruce and doctor Rogerson, became the Empress' lover. He was most influential in the commercial development of Shklov and Mogilev.

References

Further reading
 Marie Tetzlaff (In Swedish) : Katarina den Stora (Catherine the Great) (1997)

1743 births
1799 deaths
People from Žabalj
Habsburg Serbs
Habsburg monarchy emigrants to the Russian Empire
People from the Russian Empire of Serbian descent
Imperial Russian Army generals
18th-century people from the Russian Empire
18th-century Serbian people
Serbian expatriates in Russia
Slavo-Serbia
Lovers of Catherine the Great
Recipients of the Order of the White Eagle (Poland)